Cookeville is a city in Tennessee. "Cookeville" may also refer to:

Cookeville, Tennessee micropolitan area.
Cookeville Railroad Depot
Cookeville High School

See also 
Cookville